Bing-Jean Lee is currently President of Feng Chia University, Taiwan. He is a civil engineer specializing
in disaster prevention and mitigation.

Early life
Born in Taiwan, Lee graduated with a degree in civil engineering from NCKU, Taiwan in 1982. He then
received a master's degree in civil engineering from NTU Taiwan in 1984. In 1991, he graduated with
a Ph.D. degree in aerospace and engineering mechanics from UT Austin, USA.

Career
After his Ph.D., he was a postdoc at M.I.T. and UC San Diego. In 1994, he returned to Taiwan to join Feng Chia University (FCU), Taichung City, Taiwan as a faculty member. He then held 
several leadership posts at FCU: as department chairman, dean of college, and vice president of the university.
Since 2013, he has been President of FCU. He has published work related to structural engineering, and 
disaster mitigation,

Awards
In 2018, he received the outstanding university president award from the Taiwan Culture and Education
Association.

References 

Living people
Academic staff of Feng Chia University
National Taiwan University alumni
National Cheng Kung University alumni
University of Texas at Austin alumni
Year of birth missing (living people)